Alexander Sebald (born 27 July 1996) is a German professional footballer who plays as a goalkeeper for Energie Cottbus.

Career
Sebald made his Austrian Football First League debut for SC Austria Lustenau on 21 July 2017 in a game against Floridsdorfer AC.

References

External links
 

1996 births
Living people
German footballers
Association football goalkeepers
3. Liga players
Regionalliga players
2. Liga (Austria) players
SpVgg Greuther Fürth II players
Kickers Offenbach players
SC Austria Lustenau players
FC Hansa Rostock players
SV Rödinghausen players
FC Energie Cottbus players
German expatriate footballers
German expatriate sportspeople in Austria
Expatriate footballers in Austria